Metroparks Toledo, officially the Metropolitan Park District of the Toledo Area, is a public park district consisting of parks, nature preserves, a botanical garden, trail network and historic battlefield in Lucas County, Ohio.

The largest park, Oak Openings Preserve Metropark, is a centerpiece of the Oak Openings Region and features ecologically significant oak savanna landscapes and globally rare plant communities. Pearson Metropark contains one of the last remaining stands of the Great Black Swamp.

The district includes historically and culturally significant sites, including the Fallen Timbers Battlefield, surviving Miami and Erie Canal infrastructure at Side Cut and Providence Metroparks, and a variety of shelters and buildings built by the federal Works Progress Administration and Civilian Conservation Corps. Wildwood Preserve Metropark features one of the last remaining public, free-admission gardens designed by Ellen Biddle Shipman at the former manor house estate of Champion spark plug magnate Robert Stranahan.

Governance
Metroparks Toledo is governed by a five-member volunteer board of commissioners appointed by the Lucas County probate court judge. The park district administrative offices are located at Wildwood Preserve Metropark.

The system is funded by three tax levies, the state local government fund, grants and donations. In 2022, the district employed 164 full-time and part-time employees.

Metroparks 
The district comprises 19 metroparks. Two additional properties, Fort Miamis in Maumee and the Brookwood Area in Toledo, are part of the district, but are not defined as metroparks.

Land holdings 
Metroparks Toledo owns  of farmland in Toledo near Inverness Club for future development as a metropark. Metroparks officials said the future park will be the "typical Metroparks experience" with meadows and a sledding hill.

Four Maumee River islands (Marengo, Audubon, Blue Grass and Granger) totaling  are owned by Metroparks Toledo. Granger Island features a private cabin available for rent.

Regional trails 
Metroparks Toledo manages all or portions of several paved, regional rail trails.

References

External links
Metroparks Toledo

Protected areas of Lucas County, Ohio
Park districts in Ohio
Parks in Toledo, Ohio
Metroparks Toledo
New Deal in Ohio
Works Progress Administration in Toledo, Ohio